Summer Creek High School (SCHS) is a high school in unincorporated Harris County, Texas, and a part of the Humble Independent School District. It serves several areas, including Summerwood and Fall Creek, the two neighborhoods that the school get its name from.

There is also parking for students, staff, and visitors. SCHS is located at 14000 Weckford Boulevard, near the intersection of Beltway 8 and West Lake Houston Parkway.

History

Just before the beginning of the 2017–2018 school year, Kingwood High School was badly damaged by flooding caused by Hurricane Harvey. This meant that the students that year took their classes at Summer Creek High.

Principals 

 Trey Kraemer (2008-2011)
 Thyrun Hurst (2011-2014)
 Nolan Correa (2014-2017)
 Brent Mcdonald (since 2017)

Academics
For the 2018–2019 school year, the school received a B grade from the Texas Education Agency, with an overall score of 84 out of 100. The school received a B grade in all three performance domains with a score of 85 for Student Achievement, 80 for School Progress, and 81 for Closing the Gaps. The school did not receive any of the seven possible distinction designations.

Design

Summer Creek High School incorporates a Frank Lloyd Wright style to the exterior facade. The floor plan of Summer Creek is similar to Atascocita High School's, which uses the house system, or smaller learning communities. Each student will be assigned to a "house" in which they will work with an Assistant Principal-Counselor pair for all four years at the school. Core classes (Math, Science, English, and Social Studies) will be attended in that house, but electives will be located in a special wing of the school. The district believes this concept will make a rather large high school feel like a small one.

Quest High School, the district's alternate high school, moved into one of the houses at Summer Creek starting in August 2009. The school has now moved out of Summer Creek High School.

Alumni 

 Dakota Allen, linebacker for the Cleveland Browns

References

External links

 

Educational institutions established in 2009
Humble Independent School District high schools
2009 establishments in Texas